Store Trollhøin or Nørdre Trollsteinhøe is a mountain in Lom Municipality in Innlandet county, Norway. The mountain is surrounded by several other notable mountains including Finnshalspiggen to the north; Smådalshøe to the east; Grotbreahesten, Trollsteineggi, and Glittertinden to the south; Trollsteinrundhøe, Svartholshøe, and Gråhøe to the southeast; and Lauvhøe to the northwest.

See also
List of mountains of Norway by height

References

Lom, Norway
Jotunheimen
Mountains of Innlandet